Son Hye-yong (born February 25, 1980) is an athlete from North Korea who competes in archery.

At the 2008 Summer Olympics in Beijing Son finished her ranking round with a total of 618 points. This gave her the 45th seed for the final competition bracket in which she faced Mariana Avitia in the first round. The archer from Mexico eliminated Son straight away with a 112–107 score.

References

1980 births
Living people
Olympic archers of North Korea
Archers at the 2008 Summer Olympics
North Korean female archers
Archers at the 2006 Asian Games
Asian Games competitors for North Korea